George Scialabba (born 1948) is a freelance book critic living in Cambridge, Massachusetts. His reviews have appeared in Agni, The Boston Globe, Dissent, the Virginia Quarterly Review, The Nation, The American Prospect, and many other publications. Scialabba received the first Nona Balakian Excellence in Reviewing Award from the National Book Critics Circle.

Scialabba was born and raised in East Boston, MA to working-class Italian-American parents and, in his younger days, was a member of Opus Dei. He is an alumnus of Harvard University (AB, 1969) and Columbia University (MA, 1972). After working as a substitute teacher and a social worker (Massachusetts Department of Public Welfare, 1974–1980), he was a building manager at Harvard from 1980 until 2015. In 2015, after retiring from Harvard, he began writing a books column for The Baffler.

A collection of his reviews appeared in his first book, Divided Mind, published in 2006 by Arrowsmith Press. Four subsequent collections of his essays have been published by poet William Corbett's publishing house, Pressed Wafer: What Are Intellectuals Good For? (2009), The Modern Predicament (2011), For the Republic (2013), and Low Dishonest Decades: Essays & Reviews, 1980-2015. The Modern Predicament was chosen by James Wood in The New Yorker's year-end roundup of the best books of the year:

Further reading
 The Private Intellectual By Tobi Haslett, October 19, 2015, The New Yorker

References

External links 
 
 Divided Mind by Scott McLemee
 Commentary and review of What Are Intellectuals Good For? on NPR
 What Are Radicals Good For? An Interview with George Scialabba

American literary critics
American Roman Catholics
Harvard University alumni
American writers of Italian descent
Harvard University staff
Living people
1948 births
20th-century American journalists
American male journalists